Ray Franchetti is a former association football player and manager. He played for Airdrieonians and Albion Rovers in the Scottish Football League, and then managed Albion Rovers during the 1985–86 season. In 1977, he played in Canada's National Soccer League with Toronto Italia.

References

Scottish footballers
Scottish Junior Football Association players
Scottish Football League players
Celtic F.C. players
Airdrieonians F.C. (1878) players
Albion Rovers F.C. players
Scottish football managers
Albion Rovers F.C. managers
Living people
Scottish Football League managers
Association footballers not categorized by position
Year of birth missing (living people)
Toronto Italia players
Canadian National Soccer League players